The 2011 Western Illinois Leathernecks football team represented Western Illinois University in the 2011 NCAA Division I FCS football season. The Leathernecks were led by head coach Mark Hendrickson in his 2nd full season and 4th overall year since coaching the first seven games of the 2008 season. They played their home games at Hanson Field and are a member of the Missouri Valley Football Conference. They finished the season 2–9, 1–7 in MVFC play to finish in last place.

Schedule

References

Western Illinois
Western Illinois Leathernecks football seasons
Western Illinois Leathernecks football